

391001–391100 

|-bgcolor=#f2f2f2
| colspan=4 align=center | 
|}

391101–391200 

|-bgcolor=#f2f2f2
| colspan=4 align=center | 
|}

391201–391300 

|-id=257
| 391257 Wilwheaton ||  || Wil Wheaton (born 1972), an American actor and writer || 
|}

391301–391400 

|-bgcolor=#f2f2f2
| colspan=4 align=center | 
|}

391401–391500 

|-bgcolor=#f2f2f2
| colspan=4 align=center | 
|}

391501–391600 

|-bgcolor=#f2f2f2
| colspan=4 align=center | 
|}

391601–391700 

|-bgcolor=#f2f2f2
| colspan=4 align=center | 
|}

391701–391800 

|-id=795
| 391795 Univofutah ||  || The University of Utah is the flagship institution of higher learning in Utah, United States. || 
|}

391801–391900 

|-bgcolor=#f2f2f2
| colspan=4 align=center | 
|}

391901–392000 

|-id=988
| 391988 Illmárton ||  || Márton Ill (1930–2015), a Hungarian astronomer and space scientist. || 
|}

References 

391001-392000